Stephanie Crawford may refer to:
Miss Stephanie Crawford, fictional character in To Kill a Mockingbird
Stephanie Sinclaire (1954–1921), also known as Stephanie Crawford, director, writer, and film-maker